Kisses Right and Left is a 1969 Danish film directed by Ole Roos and starring Peter Bonke.

Cast
 Peter Bonke - Jack
 Jens Østerholm - Hugo
 Birgitte Bruun - Betty
 Poul Reichhardt - Edmund
 Vigga Bro - Lizzie
 Helle Hertz
 Yvonne Ingdal - Skuespillerinden
 Ove Sprogøe - Ruths Husband
 Karl Stegger - Togpassager

External links

1969 films
1960s Danish-language films
Danish black-and-white films